Jake David Robinson (born 23 October 1986) is an English footballer who plays for Worthing. Robinson plays either as a winger or striker.

Career

Brighton & Hove Albion 
Brighton-born Robinson made his debut in September 2003 against Middlesbrough, in a League Cup Second Round tie at the Riverside Stadium, and became Brighton's youngest-ever scorer (aged 16) three weeks later in a cup match against Forest Green Rovers.

On 28 October 2006, Robinson scored his first hat-trick for Brighton in a League One game against Huddersfield Town, the first hat-trick by a Brighton player in nearly five years. He scored a second hat-trick in the FA Cup game against Northwich Victoria on 11 November 2006.

After finding first-team opportunities difficult at Brighton, Robinson re-joined Aldershot Town on loan for a second loan spell until the end of the season during February 2009.

Robinson scored on his second debut for Aldershot Town during the 3–2 defeat against Exeter City on 14 February 2009, and made 19 appearances in total, scoring just four goals.

It was announced on 12 May 2009, that Robinson would be leaving Brighton after the expiration of his contract at the end of June 2009.

Shrewsbury Town
In June 2009, Robinson agreed to join League Two side Shrewsbury Town on a two-year contract.
Robinson made an excellent start to the 2010–11 season, scoring the third hat-trick of his career as Shrewsbury beat Bradford City 3–1 on the opening day.

On 31 January 2011, Robinson joined Torquay for the remainder of the season in a deal that could potentially see gulls player Nicky Wroe moving in the opposite direction. He made his debut for the club the day later against Hereford United, scoring within the first 10 minutes of the match. On 2 February it was revealed, however, that the player had not been registered and thus ineligible to play.

Due to an oversight in the loan deal it was revealed that Robinson was eligible to play for Torquay against his parent club Shrewsbury. This proved costly as later on in the season Robinson scored twice for Torquay in their 5–0 victory over Shrewsbury Town. Robinson then went on to play for Torquay in both legs of the League 2 Play-off semi-final, which by coincidence was against Shrewsbury Town. Once again Robinson proved to be a valuable asset to Torquay as they won the first leg 2–0 and drew the second leg 0–0, meaning Torquay were through and Shrewsbury were out.

Later career
After two years of playing for Northampton Town in League 2, helping them to the League 2 play off final at Wembley, Robinson decided to head back to Brighton to play for Whitehawk. Scoring regularly and helping the team in to the promotion places, many teams enquired about the striker in the English January transfer window. With Whitehawk tasting unexpected promotion, they decided to wave off offers for the in-form striker.

In May 2015, Robinson was named the Fans' Player of the Year at Whitehawk after a run which saw him net 17 goals in the regular Conference South season. He left the club in 2016 to join Hemel Hempstead Town where he scored 25 league goals in his first season.

In March 2017, Robinson became Billercay Town's record signing, joining the club for a fee of £24,000. This record would later be surpassed by the £27,600 signing of Dean Inman.

In April 2018, Robinson wrote himself into the record books at Billericay by becoming their highest ever goalscorer in a season with 52 goals. This feat was completed with league games still left to play, and he increased his tally to 57 before the end of the season.

Robinson made a bright start to the 2018–19 season, scoring 13 league goals for Billericay by 7 December 2018, at which point he left Billericay to sign for Maidstone United, following manager Harry Wheeler. After three months at Maidstone, in which he scored once, Robinson rejoined Billericay in March 2019, following Wheeler once again.

On 13 June 2021, Robinson signed for Dartford.

On 7 June 2022, Robinson signed for Worthing.

Career statistics

Honours
Brighton & Hove Albion
Football League Second Division: 2003–04

Billericay Town
Isthmian League Premier Division: 2017–18

Dartford
Kent Senior Cup: 2019–20

References

External links
 

1986 births
Living people
Footballers from Brighton
English footballers
Association football forwards
Brighton & Hove Albion F.C. players
Aldershot Town F.C. players
Shrewsbury Town F.C. players
Torquay United F.C. players
Northampton Town F.C. players
Whitehawk F.C. players
Hemel Hempstead Town F.C. players
Billericay Town F.C. players
Maidstone United F.C. players
Dartford F.C. players
Worthing F.C. players
English Football League players
National League (English football) players